Mönkhchuluuny Zorigt (born September 15, 1964) is a member of the Mongolian State Great Khural for Sükhbaatar Province. Zorigt has served as Minister of Road and Transport in the cabinet of Prime Minister Chimediin Saikhanbileg and is a founder of the Munkhchuluun Foundation for Human Development.

See also
 List of MPs elected in the Mongolian legislative election, 2012

References

1964 births
Living people
Democratic Party (Mongolia) politicians
Members of the State Great Khural